Zeng Yi (born November 6, 1979) is a Chinese singer. He sings in Mandarin Chinese as well as English, and he is a member of the Chinese popular music duo Phoenix Legend along with Yangwei Linghua.

Biography
Zeng was born in Yiyang, Hunan in China on November 6, 1973. In his early years, he was a worker. When he worked in Guangzhou, he made the acquaintance of Yangwei Linghua.

In 2011, he joined the Chinese People's Liberation Army Naval Song and Dance Troupe.

Personal life
On November 20, 2011, Zeng married Li Na in Yiyang.

References

1979 births
Living people
People from Yiyang
Singers from Hunan
21st-century Chinese male singers